The Moon Lotus is a 2011 Burmese romantic drama film, directed by Sin Yaw Mg Mg and screenplay by Nay Win Myint starring Nine Nine and Thet Mon Myint. It is an adaptation of the novel Pann Kyar Wutt Hmone by Khin Khin Htoo. The film was produced by Chin Dwin Film Production. The film's sound systems, music and subtitles were made at the Technicolor in Thailand.

Plot
Around the year 1980, U Lay Phone and Daw Khin Khin Lay had a daughter, Thiri May, and a son, Thiha Maung, who lived in Myingyan. When Thiri May was attending at the Mandalay University, she was friends with Aung Naing Thu from Kalaw. 

Aung Naing Thu's name came to light when he performed with harp skills at the fresher welcome event of university. Although Aung Naing Thu and Thiri May loved each other, they did not open up. Every long school holiday, Aung Naing visited Myingyan, hometown of Thiri May and Thiri May also visited Kalaw, hometown of Aung Naing Thu. 

After finishing school, Aung Naing Thu had to go abroad and married a foreigner. Thiri May's parents also prospered from the establishment of Thanaka business, and due to the ability of their son Thiha Maung, they was able to establish international-level Thanaka and makeup company and factory. Thiri May had an affair with the factory manager Ko Aye Moe, but refused to marry Ko Aye Moe. Thiri May often went to rest at the apartment in "Pann Kyar Wutt Hmone" yard in Pyin Oo Lwin.

After 20 years, Aung Naing Thu broke up with his wife, a foreigner of different culture and religion and came to visit Myanmar. And so, at the "Pann Kyar Wutt Hmone" yard in Pyin Oo Lwin, Thiri May's friends including Aung Naing Thu gathered and talked individually about their current lives and experiences. How will Thiri May respond when Aung Naing Thu asks for her love?

Cast
Nine Nine as Aung Naing Thu
Thet Mon Myint as Thiri May
Phyo Ngwe Soe as Aye Moe
May Kabyar
Ye Aung
Si Thu Maung
Thin Thin Yu Hlaing
Zin Myo
Min Htet Kyaw Zin
Kyaw Kyaw Paing Hmue
Aung Aung
Khin Lay Nwe
Hayman Aung Aung
Thiri Shin Thant

Release
It premiered at Hua Hin International Film Festival in Thailand on January 26, 2012.

It premiered in Singapore on November 17, 2012.

It premiered in Myanmar cinemas on June 14, 2013.

It premiered in Thailand cinemas on September 26, 2013.

It premiered at Asean Film Festival in Myanmar on March 17, 2014.

It premiered at Pyongyang International Film Festival in North Korea on September 19, 2014.

It premiered at Golden Rooster-Hundred Flowers Film Festival in China on September 23, 2014.

Awards & nominations

References

2011 films
2010s Burmese-language films
Burmese romantic drama films
Films shot in Myanmar
2011 romantic drama films